A glacial lake outburst flood (GLOF) is a type of outburst flood caused by the failure of a dam containing a glacial lake. An event similar to a GLOF, where a body of water contained by a glacier melts or overflows the glacier, is called a jökulhlaup. The dam can consist of glacier ice or a terminal moraine. Failure can happen due to erosion, a buildup of water pressure, an avalanche of rock or heavy snow, an earthquake or cryoseism, volcanic eruptions under the ice, or massive displacement of water in a glacial lake when a large portion of an adjacent glacier collapses into it.

Increasing glacial melting because of climate change, alongside other environmental effects of climate change (i.e permafrost melting) mean that regions with glaciers are likely to see increased flooding risks from GLOFs. This is especially true in the Himalayas where geologies are more active.

Definition

A glacial lake outburst flood is a type of outburst flood occurring when water dammed by a glacier or a moraine is released.  A water body that is dammed by the front of a glacier is called a marginal lake, and a water body that is capped by the glacier is called a sub-glacial lake.  When a marginal lake bursts, it may also be called a marginal lake drainage.  When a sub-glacial lake bursts, it may be called a jökulhlaup.

A jökulhlaup is thus a sub-glacial outburst flood.  Jökulhlaup is an Icelandic term that has been adopted into the English language, originally referring only to glacial outburst floods from Vatnajökull, which are triggered by volcanic eruptions, but now is accepted to describe any abrupt and large release of sub-glacial water.

Glacial lake volumes vary, but may hold millions to hundreds of millions of cubic metres of water. Catastrophic failure of the containing ice or glacial sediment can release this water over periods of minutes to days. Glacial Lake Outburst Floods are often compounded by a massive river bed erosion in the steep moraine valleys, as a result, the flood peaks increase as they flow downstream until the river reaches, where the sediment deposits. Both scenarios are significant threats to life, property and infrastructure.

Monitoring

The United Nations has a series of monitoring efforts to help prevent death and destruction in regions that are likely to experience these events. The importance of this situation has magnified over the past century due to increased populations, and the increasing number of glacial lakes that have developed due to glacier retreat. While all countries with glaciers are susceptible to this problem, central Asia, the Andes regions of South America and those countries in Europe that have glaciers in the Alps, have been identified as the regions at greatest risk.

There are a number of imminent deadly GLOFs situations that have been identified worldwide. The lake is growing larger every year due to the melting and retreat of the Trakarding Glacier, and has become the largest and most dangerous glacier lake in Nepal, with approximately 90 to 100 million m3 (117 to 130 million yd3) of water stored.

Examples

Asia

India

In June 2013 , Kedarnath in Uttarakhand witnessed flash floods along with a GLOF caused by Chorabari Tal, killing thousands of pilgrims, tourists and residents who came to visit the place.

Pakistan 
Pakistan has more than 7000 glaciers, which is more than anywhere else in the world, except for the polar regions. As of 2018, more than 3,000 glacial lakes had formed in Gilgit-Baltistan, with 30 identified by the UNDP as posing an imminent threat of glacial lake outburst flooding. In 2017, a "Scaling up of Glacial Lake Outburst Flood Risk Reduction in Northern Pakistan Project" was continued. In 1929, a GLOF from the Chong Khumdan Glacier in the Karakoram caused flooding on the Indus River 1,200 km downstream (a maximum flood rise of 8.1 m at Attock).

Bhutan

GLOFs occur with regularity in the valleys and low lying river plains of Bhutan.
In the recent past, flash floods have occurred in the Thimphu, Paro and Punankha-Wangdue valleys. Of the 2674 glacial lakes in Bhutan, 24 have been identified by a recent study as candidates for GLOFs in the near future.

In 2001, scientists identified Lake Thorthormi as one that threatened imminent and catastrophic collapse. The situation was eventually relieved by carving a water channel from the lip of the lake to relieve water pressure.

Nepal

Even though GLOF events have been occurring in Nepal for many decades, the 1985 Dig Cho glacial lake outburst has triggered detailed study of this phenomenon. In 1996, the Water and Energy Commission Secretariat (WECS) of Nepal reported that five lakes were potentially dangerous, namely, Dig Tsho, Imja, Lower Barun, Tsho Rolpa, and Thulagi, all lying above 4100 m. A 2001 study done by ICIMOD and UNEP reported 20 potentially dangerous lakes in Nepal. In ten of them GLOF events have occurred in the past few years and some have been regenerating after the event. Additional dangerous glacial lakes may exist in parts of Tibet that are drained by streams crossing into Nepal, raising the possibility of outburst incidents in Tibet causing downstream damage in Nepal. The Gandaki River basin is reported to contain 1025 glaciers and 338 lakes.

The Thulagi glacier located in the Upper Marsyangdi River basin, is one out of the two moraine-dammed lakes (supra-glacial lakes), identified as a potentially dangerous lake. The Kreditanstalt für Wiederaufbau, Frankfurt am Main, the BGR (Federal Institute for Geosciences and Natural Resources, Germany), in cooperation with the Department of Hydrology and Meteorology in Kathmandu, have carried out studies on the Thulagi Glacier and have concluded in 2011 that even assuming the worst case, a disastrous outburst of the lake can be excluded in the near future.

Tibet
Longbasaba and Pida lakes are two moraine-dammed lakes at an altitude of about 5700 m in the Eastern Himalayas.  Due to the rise of temperature, the areas of the Longbasaba and Kaer glaciers decreased by 8.7% and 16.6% from 1978 to 2005. Water from glaciers directly flowed into Longbasaba and Pida lakes, and the area of the two lakes increased by 140% and 194%.  According to the report of the Hydrological Department of  Tibet in 2006, if a GLOF had occurred at the two lakes, 23 towns and villages, where more than 12,500 people live, would have been endangered.

In Tibet, one of the major barley producing areas of the Tibetan Plateau was destroyed by GLOFs in August 2000.  More than 10,000 homes, 98 bridges and dykes were destroyed and its estimated cost was about $75 million.  The farming communities faced food shortages that year by losing their grain and livestock.

A major GLOF was reported in 1978 in the valley of the Shaksgam River in the Karakoram, a part of historic Kashmir, ceded by Pakistan to China.

Europe

Iceland

The most famous are the immense jökulhlaup released from the Vatnajökull Ice Cap in Iceland. It is not by chance that the term jökulhlaup (jökull = glacier, hlaup = run (n.)/running) comes from Icelandic, as the south of Iceland has very often been the victim of such catastrophes. This was the case in 1996, when a volcano north of the Grímsvötn lake belonging to the Vatnajökull glacier erupted, filling Grímsvötn, and then the river Skeiðará flooded the land in front of Skaftafell, now part of Vatnajökull National Park. The jökulhlaup reached a flow rate of 50,000 cubic metres per second, and destroyed parts of the Hringvegur (Ring Road or Iceland Road #1). The flood carried ice floes that weighed up to 5000 tons with icebergs between 100–200 tons striking the Gigjukvisl Bridge of the Ring Road (the ruins are well marked with explanatory signs today as a popular tourist stop). The flood carried with it 185 million tons of silt.
The jökulhlaup flow made it for several days the 2nd largest river (in terms of water flow) after the Amazon.

The peak water release from a lake that develops around the Grímsvötn Volcanic Crater in the center of the Vatnajökull ice cap generates flows that exceed the volume of the Mississippi River. The outbursts have occurred in 1954, 1960, 1965, 1972, 1976, 1982, 1983, 1986, 1991 and 1996.

Strait of Dover
The Strait of Dover is thought to have been created around 200,000 years ago by a catastrophic GLOF caused by the breaching of the Weald-Artois Anticline, which acted as a natural dam that held back a large lake in the Doggerland region, now submerged under the North Sea. The flood would have lasted several months, releasing as much as one million cubic metres of water per second. The cause of the breach is not known but may have been caused by an earthquake or simply the build-up of water pressure in the lake. As well as destroying the isthmus that connected Britain to continental Europe, the flood carved a large bedrock-floored valley down the length of the English Channel, leaving behind streamlined islands and longitudinal erosional grooves characteristic of catastrophic megaflood events.

Swiss Alps
The 1818 Giétro Glacier catastrophe, killing 44 people, originated in a 4-km long valley located in south-western Switzerland. Fatal flooding was known during historical times with 140 deaths first recorded in 1595. After an increase of the glacier during the "Year Without a Summer", an ice cone started to form from the accumulation of falling seracs. During 1816, the valley filled into a lake which emptied during the spring of 1817. In spring of 1818, the lake measured about 2 km in length. To stop the rapid rise of waters, the canton engineer Ignaz Venetz decided to drill a sluice hole through the ice, tunneling from both upstream and downstream sides of the ice dam at an elevation of about 20 metres above the lake surface. An avalanche interrupted work, so a secondary tunnel was then drilled for safety reasons as the waters rose to 10 metres below. Dangerous sloughing of ice delayed the work until finally a 198-metre-long hole was completed on 4 June, days before lake began to escape via the manmade waterfall on 13 June. Venetz warned the inhabitants of the valley of the danger as water was also escaping from the base of the cone. However, the cone began to crack on the morning of 16 June and at 16:30 the ice dam broke sending 18 million m3 of flood waters into the valley below.

Americas

Alaska
During the late Quaternary, ancient Lake Atna in the Copper River Basin may have generated a number of glacial outburst floods.

Some jökulhlaups release annually. Lake George near the Knik River had large annual outbreaks from 1918 to 1966. Since 1966 the Knik Glacier has retreated and an ice-dam is no longer created. Lake George might resume annual floods if the glacier thickens again and blocks the valley (Post and Mayo, 1971).

Almost every year, GLOFs occur in two locations in southeastern Alaska, one of which is Abyss Lake. The releases associated with the Tulsequah Glacier near Juneau often inundate a nearby airstrip. About 40 cabins could potentially be affected and a few have been damaged by the larger floods.  Events from Salmon Glacier near Hyder have damaged roads near the Salmon River.

Contiguous United States
Immense prehistoric GLOFs, known as the Missoula Floods or Spokane Floods, occurred in North America's Columbia River watershed toward the end of the last ice age.  They were the result of periodic breaches of ice dams in present-day Montana, resulting in the draining of a body of water now known as Glacial Lake Missoula. The immense floods scoured the Columbia Plateau as the water raced toward the ocean, resulting in the Channeled Scablands topography that exists today across Central and Eastern Washington.

Glacial River Warren drained Glacial Lake Agassiz during the Wisconsinian glaciation; the now mild Minnesota River flows through its bed. This river seasonally drained glacial meltwater into what is now the Upper Mississippi River. The region now termed the Driftless Area of North America was contemporaneously also subject to glacial outburst floods from Glacial Lake Grantsburg, and Glacial Lake Duluth during all three phases of the last ice age.

Between 6 and 10 September 2003, a GLOF occurred from Grasshopper Glacier in the Wind River Mountains, Wyoming. Debris from the flood was deposited more than  along the creek. The GLOF has been attributed to the rapid retreat of the glacier, which has been ongoing since the glacier was first accurately measured in the 1960s.

Peru 
A flood caused by a glacial lake outburst flood on December 13, 1941, killed an estimated 1,800 people along its path in Peru, including many in the town of Huaraz. The cause was a block of ice that fell from a glacier in the Cordillera Blanca mountains into Lake Palcacocha. This event has been described  as a historic inspiration for research into glacial lake outburst floods. Numerous Peruvian geologists and engineers created techniques for avoiding such floods and exported the techniques worldwide.

Canada
In 1978, debris flows triggered by a jökulhlaup from Cathedral Glacier destroyed part of the Canadian Pacific railway track, derailed a freight train and buried parts of the Trans Canada Highway.

In 1994, a jökulhlaup occurred at Farrow Creek, British Columbia.

In 2003, a jökulhlaup drained into Lake Tuborg on Ellesmere Island, and the events and its aftermath were monitored. The ice-dammed lake drained catastrophically by floating its ice dam. This is an extremely rare occurrence in the Canadian High Arctic, where most glaciers are cold based, and ice-dammed lakes typically drain slowly by overtopping their dams.

It has been suggested that the Heinrich events during the last glaciation could have been caused by gigantic jökulhlaups from a Hudson Bay lake dammed by ice at the mouth of Hudson Strait.

See also

Footnotes

References
Post, A. & Mayo, L.R. Glacier Dammed Lakes and Outburst Floods in Alaska. HYDROLOGIC INVESTIGATIONS ATLAS HA-455. Anchorage, Alaska (1971) U.S. Geological Survey, Denver CO.
Rudoy, A.N. (1998) Mountain Ice-Dammed Lakes of Southern Siberia and their Influence on the Development and Regime of the Runoff Systems of North Asia in the Late Pleistocene. Chapter 16, pp. 215–234. — Palaeohydrology and Environmental Change / Eds: G. Benito, V.R. Baker, K.J. Gregory. — Chichester: John Wiley & Sons Ltd. 353 p. 
Rudoy A.N. & Baker, V.R.  Sedimentary Effects of cataclysmic late Pleistocene glacial Flooding, Altai Mountains, Siberia // Sedimentary Geology , (1993) Vol. 85. N 1–4. pp. 53–62.

External links

 The channeled scabland: a guide to the geomorphology of the Columbia Basin, Washington : prepared for the Comparative Planetary Geology Field Conference held in the Columbia Basin, 5–8 June 1978 / sponsored by Planetary Geology Program, Office of Space Science, National Aeronautics and Space Administration ; edited by Victor R. Baker and Dag Nummedal.
 Рудой А. Н. Giant current ripples: A Review. Гигантская рябь течения: обзор новейших данных.  
 Рудой А. Н. Scablands. Скэбленд: экзотические ландшафты. 
 Chuya Flood Video 
 Glacial Lakes and Glacial Lake Outburst Floods in Nepal. – International Centre for Integrated Mountain Development, Kathmandu, March 2011 
 Lasafam Iturrizaga. GLACIER LAKE OUTBURST FLOODS / "Encyclopedia of Snow, Ice and Glaciers"  Springer, 2011/Eds. Vijay P. Singh, Pratap Singh and Umesh K. Haritashya 

Volcanology
+
Flood